Victor Tortez (18 July 1843 — 1890) was a French painter of the beaux arts school, taught by Jean-Jacques Henner. His paintings ranged from studio portraits of aristocrats to nude studies of women and children.

Tortez was born in Paris and was a pupil of Jean-Léon Gérôme.

References 

< Birth archives de PARIS V3E/N2139>

19th-century French painters
French male painters
1843 births
1890 deaths
19th-century French male artists